Ippei Kojima (born 1944) is a former Japanese badminton player who won a record eight Japanese national men's singles titles and some major international titles in both singles and doubles between the mid-1960s and the mid-1970s.

Career
His game was marked by exceptional foot speed, great tenacity, and power surprising for a man who was about five feet  (1.524 meters) tall. Kojima is the first of only two Japanese players to have won men's singles at the prestigious Danish Open (1970). He also shared the Danish Open men's doubles title, with different partners, in 1968 and 1969. In 1970 he reached the final of all three events at both the U.S. and Canadian Open championships, winning men's doubles in the U.S. and both singles and mixed doubles in Canada. In 1971 he won men's singles at the Singapore Open and over a select international field at the Flare Square Invitational, a one-time-only event held in conjunction with the Calgary (Canada) Stampede, where he defeated Denmark's Svend Pri in the final. Perhaps the most notable matches of Kojima's career were a series of close but losing singles efforts against the iconic Rudy Hartono in Thomas Cup, the All-Englands, and other major venues in 1970 and 1971.

Achievements

Asian Games 
Men's singles

International tournaments 
Men's singles

Men's doubles

Mixed doubles

References 

1944 births
Living people
Japanese male badminton players
Asian Games medalists in badminton
Badminton players at the 1972 Summer Olympics
Badminton players at the 1966 Asian Games
Badminton players at the 1970 Asian Games
Asian Games bronze medalists for Japan
Medalists at the 1966 Asian Games
Medalists at the 1970 Asian Games
20th-century Japanese people